Pauline Picard (April 27, 1947 – June 29, 2009) was a Quebec politician. She was the Bloc Québécois Member of Parliament for the riding of Drummond from 1993 to 2008.

Born in Saint-Gabriel-de-Kamouraska, she was an administrative assistant, employment consultant, and financial advisor before she was first elected in 1993. She was re-elected in 1997, 2000 and 2004. She served as the Deputy Whip of the Bloc Québécois.

She did not run for re-election in the 2008 election. She died on June 29, 2009, after a struggle with lung cancer.

Electoral record

References

External links
 

1947 births
2009 deaths
Bloc Québécois MPs
Women members of the House of Commons of Canada
Deaths from cancer in Quebec
Deaths from breast cancer
French Quebecers
Members of the House of Commons of Canada from Quebec
People from Bas-Saint-Laurent
People from Drummondville
Women in Quebec politics
21st-century Canadian politicians
21st-century Canadian women politicians
20th-century Canadian women politicians